The Federal Acquisition Regulation (FAR) is the principal set of rules regarding Government procurement in the United States, and is codified at Chapter 1 of Title 48 of the Code of Federal Regulations, . It covers many of the contracts issued by the US military and NASA, as well as US civilian federal agencies.

The largest single part of the FAR is Part 52, which contains standard solicitation provisions and contract clauses. Solicitation provisions are certification requirements, notices, and instructions directed at firms that might be interested in competing for a specific contract. These provisions and clauses are of six types: (i) required solicitation provisions; (ii) required-when-applicable solicitation provisions; (iii) optional solicitation provisions; (iv) required contract clauses; (v) required-when-applicable contract clauses; and (vi) optional contract clauses."

If the FAR requires that a clause be included in a government contract, but that clause is omitted, case law may provide that the missing clause is deemed to be included. This is known as the Christian Doctrine, which is based on the underlying principle that certain government regulations have the force and effect of law, and government personnel may not deviate from the law without proper authorization. Prospective contractors are presumed to know the law, including the limits of the authority of government personnel. Thus, a mandatory clause that expresses a significant or deeply ingrained strand of public procurement policy will be incorporated into a Government contract by operation of law, even if the parties intentionally omitted it.

A contract award can be challenged and set aside if a protester can prove that either the contracting agency or the contract awardee did not comply with the requirements of the solicitation. A successful protest can result in reconsideration of the decision to award the contract or award of the contract to the protester in lieu of the original awardee. Even though a successful protester may not ultimately be awarded the contract, the government agency may have to pay the protester's bid and proposal costs.

Structure 
The Federal Acquisition Regulation is contained within Chapter 1 of Title 48 of the Code of Federal Regulations (CFR). Chapter 1 is divided into Subchapters A-H, which encompass Parts 1-53. Chapter 1 appears in two volumes, with Subchapters A-G appearing in Volume 1 while Subchapter H occupies all of Volume 2. The volumes are not formal subdivisions of Title 48, but refer instead to the fact that the FAR is printed by the Government Printing Office in two volumes for convenience.

The single most heavily regulated aspect of acquisition is contract pricing, which is addressed throughout the FAR, but especially in Subpart 15.4, Parts 30 and 31, and Subparts 42.7, 42.8, and 42.17. A large part of the FAR, Subchapter D, describes various socio-economic programs, such as the various small business programs, purchases from foreign sources, and laws written to protect laborers and professionals working under government contracts.

The final three chapters of Title 48 (61, 63 and 99) establish the Civilian Board of Contract Appeals, the Department of Transportation Board of Contract Appeals, and the Cost Accounting Standards Board, respectively. The Armed Services Board of Contract Appeals has been established by charter within the Department of Defense.

The proper way to cite a regulation within the FAR is by part, subpart, section, subsection, without respect to chapter or subchapter. For instance, the FAR rule on legislative lobbying costs is found at FAR Part 31, Section 205, Subsection 22 (cited as "FAR 31.205-22").

The table of contents, as of the edition published October 1, 2012, is available.

Supplements 
As the original purpose of the FAR was to consolidate the numerous individual agency regulations into one comprehensive set of standards which would apply government-wide, the issuance of supplemental regulations is closely governed by the FAR. Nearly every major cabinet-level department (and many agencies below them) has issued such regulations, which often place further restrictions or requirements on contractors and contracting officers.

One of the best-known examples of an agency supplement is the Defense Federal Acquisition Regulation Supplement (DFARS), used by the Department of Defense, which constitutes Chapter 2. Chapter 3 is the Department of Health and Human Services Acquisition Regulation; Chapter 4 is the Department of Agriculture's Acquisition Regulation; etc. The Department of Veterans Affairs' Acquisition Regulation (VAAR) implements and supplements the FAR.

The required format for agency FAR supplements is to follow the basic FAR format. To continue the example above, the supplemental DFARS section on legislative lobbying costs is DFARS Subpart 231, Section 205, Subsection 22 (cited as "DFARS 231.205-22").

Provisions

Vision
Part 1 refers to a "vision" and certain "guiding principles" for the Federal Acquisition System. The vision foresees "delivery on a timely basis [of] the best value product or service ... while maintaining the public's trust and fulfilling public policy objectives". Compliance with the Regulation, along with the use of initiative in the interests of the Government in areas not specifically addressed in the FAR or prohibited by law, are required and expected of all members of the Acquisition Team. The Acquisition Team consists of all those who participate in Government acquisition:
- the technical, supply, and procurement communities
- the customers they serve, and
- the contractors who provide the products and services.

The role and operation of those involved as a 'team' in government procurement is defined in FAR 1.102-3 and RAR 1.102-4. The FAR system is intended to promote "teamwork, unity of purpose and open communication".

Definitions
FAR Part 2 defines words and terms used frequently in the FAR.

Deviations 
FAR Subpart 1.4, Deviations from the FAR, provides the steps needed to document deviations from the mandatory FAR or agency FAR supplement. Deviation documentation is needed if there is a precise FAR clause or provision for the issue. The Department of Defense has published many class deviations to enable faster contract actions in war environments.

FAR 12.401 allows contracts for commercial items to be tailored to a great extent, therefore deviating in many particulars from the mandatory clause language. See also FAR 12.211, Technical Data; FAR 12.212, Computer Software; FAR 12.213, Other Commercial Practices for additional authority to deviate or "tailor" FAR clauses and provisions in the context of commercial items/services.

Improper business practices and personal conflicts of interest
Part 3 addresses various improper business practices and personal conflicts of interest. Within this section, sub-part 3.6 generally prevents government contracts being knowingly awarded to a Government employee or to an organisation owned or substantially owned by one or more Government employees. Similar wording was previously included in the Federal Procurement Regulations prior to 1984, with several GAO decisions confirming that an agency does not violate this sub-part if neither the Contracting Officer not the selection officer has knowledge of such ownership or business connection.

Ratifications 
A ratification is the proper authorization by a contracting officer of an earlier procurement by a Government employee who was not authorized to do it. A ratification package has a legal memo that says an unauthorized commitment was made, that the commitment could properly have been done by contracting officers, and that funds were and are available for it. Other regulations and agency rules apply too, such as those from the Army discussed below.

Ratifications are governed by FAR 1.602-3 (Ratification of Unauthorized Commitments), originally added to the FAR in 1988, which defines a ratification as the act of approving an unauthorized commitment by an official who has the authority to do so. Unauthorized commitment means an agreement that is not binding solely because the Government representative who made it lacked the authority to enter into that agreement on behalf of the Government. A ratifying official may ratify only when: (1) The Government has received the goods or services; (2) The ratifying official has authority to obligate the United States, and had that authority at the time of the unauthorized commitment; (3) The resulting contract would otherwise be proper, i.e., adequate funds are available, the contract is not prohibited by law, the ratification is in accordance with agency procedures, etc.; (4) The contracting officer determines that the price paid was fair and reasonable and recommends payment, and legal counsel concurs.

There are dollar limits to the authority to ratify unauthorized commitments. A Chief of Contracting Office can approve up to $10,000. A Principal Assistant Responsible for Contracting can approve up to $100,000. A Head of Contracting Authority can approve higher amounts.

Ratifications in the U.S. Army call for a signed statement describing the unauthorized commitment, the value of the procurement, and other documentation. Then a contracting officer is to study the case and recommend action. If the procurement is not ratified, the matter may be handled under FAR Part 50 and DFARS Part 250 (Public Law 85-804) as a GAO claim or some other way.

Contractor damage 
FAR Part 45 provides rules on the Contractor's obligations and the Government's remedies in these cases. Specific clauses should be in the contract to deal with Government Furnished Equipment (GFE) situations and bring your own device (BYOD) situations.

Commercial items 
The authority under FAR Part 12, Commercial Items (and services), must be used thoughtfully and carefully. It is very tempting for a contracting officer to use FAR Part 12 and hence FAR Part 13 in situations where such use is clearly not appropriate in view of the basic reasons commercial item acquisition authority was created by Congress.

FAR 2.101 provides that

a commercial item means – (6) services of a type offered and sold competitively in substantial quantities in the commercial marketplace based on established catalog or market prices for specific tasks performed or specific outcomes to be achieved and under standard commercial terms and conditions. This does not include services that are sold based on hourly rates without an established catalog or market price for a specific service performed or specific outcomes to be achieved. For purposes of these services –
(i) catalog price means a price included in a catalog, price list, schedule or other form that is regularly maintained by the manufacturer or vendor, is either published or otherwise available for inspection by customers and states prices at which sales are currently, or were last, made to a significant number of buyers constituting the general public; and
(ii) market prices mean current prices that are established in the course of ordinary trade between buyers and sellers free to bargain and that can be substantiated through competition or from sources independent of the offerors.

Note the emphasis in the FAR 2.101 definition for commercial items on established market prices. The reason why Simplified Acquisition Procedures are permitted for items above the $250,000 simplified acquisition threshold for commercial items is there is an efficient market pricing mechanism which pressures market participants to provide goods and services at a fair and reasonable price which represents very efficient / non-wasteful pricing mechanisms. Generally, the more efficient and well-developed markets have a large number of participating vendors and information is freely available to consumers in that market on the relative merits of each vendor's products and pricing which permits easy comparison of each vendor's products to each other. FAR Part 12 commercial items acquisition authority was intended to take advantage of the WalMart's (R) and Microsoft's (R) of the world where there is no need to go through the extensive, formalistic and resource/ time-consuming process of a fully negotiated procurement, which requires vendors provide cost and pricing information, to verify a fair and reasonable price. In other words, FAR Part 12 was intended to increase the number of competitors available to the US Government by jettisoning all of the unique requirements, including cost accounting systems, which are forced upon Federal contractors by acquisition processes such as FAR Parts 14, 15, 36 etc.; instead, the Federal Government could act more like a normal buyer in a fully functioning commercial market where the Government was but one of a large number of consumers seeking the same or highly similar products or services. However, FAR Part 12 was never intended to apply where the US Government was the only or one of a very few buyers for an item or service not in demand by the commercial market place.

What happens when there are very few market participants and the goods or services are not widely available to the public? Let's take surveillance systems in a military overseas contingency environment as an example. Battlefield full motion video is not something that is found in the commercial sector – Wal-Marts don't sell this; moreover, frequently there are special restrictions which impact on commercial firms ability to engage in work of this nature. For example, special FAA Administrator permission is required before a US certificated aircraft or pilot can fly in Iraq under Special Federal Aviation Regulation (SFAR) 77; if there are very few, or only one, vendor who can participate in this requirement, there are no vendors out there for meaningful competition which is the bedrock assumption of FAR Parts 12 and 13. In view of the above, the airborne recon contract is NOT a commercial service – therefore the use of FAR Part 12 commercial items contracting processes is wholly inappropriate and not permissible under the applicable laws governing Federal acquisition.

Taking another example, what happens when significant research and development is needed to adopt a commercial item for Government use? Should FAR Parts 12 and 13 be used here? Absolutely not. There are no market pricing mechanisms for the non-standard variant – the Government is the only buyer of this particular variant of the commercially available item.

What about situations where Government demand overwhelms the commercial markets supply? In this case, the Government is actually competing against itself because it has swallowed the market whole and usually has multiple requiring activities competing against each other for the same goods and services. This is exemplified in cases where numerous contracting offices demand the same goods and services unknowingly are driving prices up against each other. Frequently in these case, contracting commands accept take-it or leave-it prices from relatively few vendors (compared to demand) who know that these contracting offices are not coordinating amongst each other or establishing commodity control councils to ration demand against the civilian sources of supply. As the US Federal Reserve will attest to, inflation is one of the most damaging elements in an economic system to investment, capital markets and economic activity. In this case, the effect of driving massive cost inflation directly impacts civilians and non-Government consumers who are also competing for the same goods and services against the US Government acquisition commands; ultimately the deep pockets of the Government win out against the lesser buying power of the non-governmental market participants. In such cases, as the US Government did during World War II, commodity control councils must be established to identify all available sources of supply and ration supply to the various consumers, including US Government consumers, sometimes with price controls (although this is very dangerous because it frequently leads to black markets run by criminals). One solution in this case is to identify markets unaffected by the Government demand and seek to acquire goods and services through that other market. When the situation of overwhelming government demand occurs in a faltering or damaged economy, Government demand that is in excess of what the local vendors can supply to both Government and non-Government consumers should be met by vendors who operate out of the market in question, including through the GSA Schedule system if the damaged market is outside of the United States. Resources and expertise are in the Federal Government that are designed to assist in cases where Federal demand overwhelms civilian supply, one example being the Industrial College of the Armed Forces (ICAF). The ICAF's charter is to maintain the ability to nationalize an economy to achieve strategic objectives or a wartime mobilization, this is a good resource expertise in this particular area. Use of FAR Parts 12 and 13 without rationing of demand through a single commodity control council or finding other solutions is likely to create more problems than it solves. Non-commercial contracting methodology and clauses should be used for any acquisition where Government demand overwhelms civilian supply. It is highly unlikely there will be any cost controls or a fair and reasonable price obtained for non-commercial services or goods obtained using FAR Parts 12 and FAR 13 under these circumstances.

Unsolicited proposals
Sub-part 15.6 covers unsolicited proposals, i.e. business proposals offering new and innovative ideas outside the context of innovative proposals invited and offered within a government-initiated procurement procedure. The regulations suggest the executive agencies make provision for acceptance of unsolicited proposals and for prior contact with individuals or organisations contemplating submission of such a proposal.

Service contracts 
Special rules apply to service contracts. They must be performance-based to the extent practicable, with measurable outcomes. FAR 37.102 and FAR Part 37.6 describe performance-based methods. FAR 37.601 has specific requirements for performance work statements (PWS) for service contracts requiring performance-based standards. Agency supplements also require performance-based acquisitions. (See, e.g., DFARS 237.170 Approval of contracts and task orders for services; DFARS 237.170-2 Approval requirements.)

Performance Based Service Acquisition (PBSA) is a process and way of defining requirements that yields well written work statements that are outcome oriented and measurable thus enforceable. Deming/Six Sigma style quality assessments and process analysis can help define performance work statements. A Performance Work Statement (PWS) has:
 An outcome-based definition of the service deliverable
 Performance standards that are measurable
 A plan for measuring and evaluating performance
 A matrix of related services i.e., generator maintenance, that has subsets of services underneath them
The DOD PBSA guide has a "performance requirements summary" matrix which can serve as an outline for work statement provisions.

Army Federal Acquisition Regulation (FAR) Supplement (AFARS) has an outline for performance-based service contracts.

Additional Resources for PBSA:
 Office of Management and Budget, Office of Federal Procurement Policy, Performance Based Service Acquisition
 Army Material Command PBSA site
 NASA
 Defense Acquisition University – Performance-based services acquisition links and templates
 The Guidebook for Performance-Based Services Acquisition (PBSA) in the Department of Defense December 2000 is an outstanding resource with many examples and ideas
 Army Material Command (AMC) Pamphlet 715-17, Guide for Preparation and Use of Performance Based Specifications
 Interactive Internet presentation on performance-based services acquisition
 Air Force Instruction 63–124, Performance-Based Services Acquisition
The Office of Federal Procurement Policy (OFPP) has a Draft Best Practices Guide on Contractor Performance

Personal services contracts 
The term "personal services contract" means a contract with express terms or administration which makes the contractor personnel appear effectively to be Government employees. Such contracts are prohibited by the FAR (subpart 37.104) excepting where specifically authorized by statute.
 Contractors are NOT employees – no remedies under personnel law and no remedies under contract law if vague/badly written work statements used
 Inherent governmental restrictions (See OMB Circular A-76) and FAR Part 37
 FAR Subpart 9.5 Organizational Conflicts of Interest Organizational and Consultant Conflicts of Interest (OCIE) problems
"Nonpersonal services contract" means a contract under which the personnel rendering the services are not subject, either by the contract's terms or by the manner of its administration, to the supervision and control usually prevailing in relationships between the Government and its employees.

Advisory and assistance services (A&AS) are permissible (See FAR Subpart 37.2)

Personal services are not permissible (See FAR 37.104 and Classification Act) without specific authority to obtain such services (meaning statutory authority)

Permissible to acquire expert and consultant services (5 USC 3109 or 10 USC 129b – expert services) or 10 USC 1091 – health services), as well as health services, intelligence, counter intelligence or special operations command operations requirements under DFARS 237.104, Personal Services Contracts and 10 USC 129b – Contracting must do a determination and finding (D&F) (per FAR Subpart 1.7 and DFARS Subpart 237.104) for this

DFARS 237.170-2 forbids non-performance-based contracts unless exception done under DFARS 237.170-2

If an agency is hiring experts, read over 5 USC 3109, Employment of Experts and Consultants, Temporary or Intermittent to see if it applies to FAR 37.104(f). Office of Personnel Management (OPM) has established requirements that apply in acquiring personal services for experts or consultants in this manner (for example, benefits, taxes, conflicts of interest), "therefore, the contracting officer shall effect necessary coordination with the cognizant civilian personnel office." Note that personal service contracts are potentially subject to salary caps

"Inherently Governmental Functions" may not be performed by contractors other than a specific Personal Services Contract under the authority of P.L. 86-36 or 5 USC 3109. Inherently Governmental Functions are defined by P.L. 105-270 (FAIR Act of 1998) as a function so intimately related to the public interest as to require performance by Federal Government employees. These involve the exercise of discretion in applying Federal Government authority or making a value judgement in decisions for the Federal Government, such as monetary transactions and entitlements, determination of agency policy or program priorities, and hiring or direction of Federal employees.

See also 10 USC 2331 Procurement of services: contracts for professional and technical services and AFARS 5137.104—Personal Services Contracts.

See also agency regulations on specific prohibitions on use of service contractors for inherently governmental activities under OMB Circular A-76, for example, Army Regulation (AR) 735–5, para 2-11 sets out those property accountability tasks which can and cannot be performed by contractors. (Basically, contractors may not exercise any discretionary authority.)

Examples of prohibited personal services:
 Clerical/administrative/secretarial support to Government personnel
 Technical/Managerial performance of same or similar jobs performed by Government personnel
 Any contractor personnel working in a Government facility and supervised/directed by Government

Health care 
Special acquisitions rules and laws govern acquisition of health or medical related services. For example, DoD Instruction (DoDI) 6025.5, Personal Services Contracts (PSCS) for Health Care Providers (HCPS) has extensive requirements that must be addressed in any DoD health care contract. DoD 6025.18-R, DoD Health Information Privacy Regulation also has substantial mandates concerning medical records as well as HIPAA compliance. See http://biotech.law.lsu.edu/blaw/dodd/corres/html/602518r.htm

Military service regulations also deal with this issue extensively: for example, See AR 40-400 Medical Support Provisions – Authority

Accessibility 
On Sept 10th, 2021 FAR updated its set of rules to shift from accommodations to building accessibility into the products and services government buys. federal agencies are now required to:
 specifically identify which ICT accessibility standards are applicable to a procurement;
 document in writing any exceptions or exemptions in their formal acquisition plans;
 identify the needs of current and future users with disabilities and proactively determine how ICT functionality will be available to these users;
 specify the development, installation, configuration, and maintenance of ICT in support of users with disabilities.

The new rules implement U.S. Access Board's revisions by strengthening FAR requirements for accessibility in Information and Communication Technology (ICT). Section 508 requires that federal agencies “develop, procure, maintain, or use” ICT. This adoption in FAR will help the public and Federal employees have comparable access whether they have a disability, or not.

Intellectual property (IP) / data rights / technical data rights 

From the Government perspective, the most critical aspect of IP, data, technical data and patent rights revolve around freedom to operate and freedom of contract, namely freedom to have maximum competition. From the perspective of a contractor, the most critical aspect of this area is protection of competitive advantage from disclosure to its competitors. In other words, the contractor/commercial vendor wants to retain its ability to have a product to sell – inherent in this desire is a need to prevent the Government from disclosing important technical data, e.g., engineering designs, schematics, specifications, to its competitors when the Government conducts a follow-on acquisition and attempts to seek competition to meet legal and policy mandates in the Competition in Contracting Act (CICA) and Armed Services Procurement Act.

IP, data rights and technical data rights is a highly specialized practice area in Federal acquisitions. Careful examination of FAR Part 27 and applicable agency FAR supplements (for example, DFARS 227) must be performed and consultation with a wide variety of Federal statutes accomplished before attempting to deal with IP/data/technical data.

A number of variables drive allocation and use of IP/data/technical data including whether or not the subject of the contract is for research and development (R&D), small business/non-profit or non-small business/for-profit, source of funds used to create the IP in question (exclusively private, exclusively Government or mixed funds), acquisition of commercial or non-commercial items/services and whether software or non-software is being acquired. Additional clauses must be added to the acquisition for patent/data/technical data and specific CLINs must be added for data/technical data deliverables per the FAR/DFAR. Various agency regulations separately deal with technical data acquisition as well and must be consulted.

There is a difference between FAR and agency supplements. For example, the FAR focuses on "data" while the DFAR provisions focus on the narrower subset of "technical data". For technical data, DFARS 227.7102-3(b) states "Use the clause at 252.227-7013, Rights in Technical Data--Noncommercial Items, in lieu of the clause at 252.227-7015 if the Government will pay any portion of the development costs. ..." Thus, the Government would not be using that clause if it was not paying some portion of development costs – the question is whether or not this particular item's development costs were in fact paid for by the Government. It is prudent to make this determination up front in the CLIN structure of a contract for technical data deliverables.

There are different categories of technical data which are addressed in different sections of the Defense Federal Acquisition Regulation (FAR) Supplement (DFARS). These main categories are technical data (defined not to include specific categories as called out in this list), software, and SBIR technical data. Technical data and software each are subdivided into two additional sub categories, commercial and non-commercial. Separate treatment and clauses are provided for each sub-category.

Generally, there are specific issues which must be addressed in any technical data rights or software acquisition, which include:

- Required contract clauses and provisions (driven by the below categories) (commercial versus non-commercial; software vs non-software; SIBR versus non-SBIR; technical and scientific information versus non-technical and non-scientific information; and special cases discussed in DFARS 227)

- Disclosure of technical data use restrictions as a part of the offer / proposal (for example, DFARS 252.227.7017 clause)

- Markings provisions (includes basic markings clause plus challenge clause)

- Required contract line item numbers (CLIN) structure (broken out for each category/type which are segregable – must be specifically expanded upon in the work statement / contract specifications; each CLIN must be separately priced; this is NOT THE CDRLS. CDRLS are separate.)

It is absolutely critical that both contracting and the requiring activity both understand the categories and subcategories of technical data as well as data. A basic understanding of the patent rights clauses are also necessary. Both technical data (and/or data) AND the patent rights clauses must be included as they are completely separate from each other.

Accordingly, it is important to understand your requirement and whether or not the acquisition or the deliverables fit into these categories because it drives acquisition planning and required clauses and provisions that must be inserted into the solicitation. It is normal for MULTIPLE contract clauses and provisions to be inserted into the contract solicitation for the acquisition of a SINGLE CATEGORY of technical data (for example, DFARS 7013, Non-Commercial Technical Data, and 7017 clauses). However, it is important to note that if multiple categories of technical data (or even FAR data) is to be acquired, multiple categories of technical data clauses must be inserted and each contract line item number (CLIN) must be specifically drafted to cover each separate CATEGORY of technical data (e.g., commercial AND separately non-commercial software)

Technical data for DoD contracts is defined at the DFARS 252.227.7013 clause, paragraph a, subparagraph (14): ""Technical data" means recorded information, regardless of the form or method of the recording, of a scientific or technical nature (including computer software documentation). The term does not include computer software or data incidental to contract administration, such as financial and/or management information." There are separate clauses for software (commercial and non-commercial).

The two standards technical data rights clauses in the FAR are the DFARS 252.227.7013 (non-commercial technical data) and the 252.227.7015 (commercial technical data) – neither of which covers software or software documentation.

Non-commercial software and its documentation are covered by the DFARS 252.227.7014 clause.

Commercial software acquisitions are dealt with only briefly at DFARS 227.7202 which essentially says that the Government shall get the rights customarily obtained by customers in the relevant software market, the Government shall obtain the minimum rights necessary for the Government's purposes, and that the Government cannot force the commercial vendor to give up rights. The Government cannot issue a unilateral modification forcing delivery of rights in computer software; mutual consent is mandated by law and DFARS provisions for commercial software acquisitions. The contract clause that is normally in a commercial software contract acquisition is the FAR 52.212-4, Commercial Items, clause. This clause mirrors the above intent which states that the Government will have rights provided to the normal consumer in that particular market, which in reality are defined by a separate software license. Licenses for software routinely have provisions which are illegal in Government contracts. In particular, see FAR 12.304 for the provisions of the 52.212-4 clause which may be tailored and which ones that may not as well as some provisions that may NEVER be in a Government contract except under very specific circumstances (for example, indemnification agreements, provisions which require the Government to give up control of litigation (usually for patent infringement lawsuits against the Government/licensee, invoicing, and remedies). Separately, examine the 52.212-4 clause as well as the software license and determine if they have provisions which either overlap or contradict each other. If so, then the two will have to be reconciled – essentially, the license will have to be rewritten to address any conflict with a provision which tells which one will control – either the license or the 52.212-4 clause.

The broader category of know-how, etc. is covered by the "data" provisions of the FAR. Note that DFARS part 227 scope provision requires that DOD use the DFARS 227 provisions rather than the FAR 27 provisions. However, it is important to remember that the FAR data provisions include both "data" and "technical data". The scope section is inartfully drafted because a literal reading would compel use of clauses which are specifically limited to scientific and technical information – you have to use the much broader FAR clauses to go after "data" which is not scientific or technical information.

DFARS 227.7103-1, Policy, para (c) says that "Offerors shall not be required ... to sell or otherwise relinquish to the Government any rights in technical data related to items, components or processes developed at private expense solely because the Government's rights to use, modify, release, reproduce, perform, display, or disclose technical data pertaining to those items may be restricted." HOWEVER, the Government may include a source selection criteria which rates offers more favorably or higher which provide desired technical data rights.

A detailed discussion of intellectual property in Government contracts can be found in a variety of sources, including Intellectual Property in Government Contracts by Ralph C. Nash, Jr. and Leonard Rawicz published by CCH/Wolters Kluwer, as well as Licensing Software and Technology to the U.S. Government: the Complete Guide to Rights to Intellectual Property in Prime Contracts and Subcontracts. However, note that neither of these books provide a nuts and bolts explanation on how to deal with commercial computer software licenses as discussed above. These books provide a high level discussion of the law and regulations, history and policy involved, which is useful.

Categories of Technical Data Rights:

DFARS 227.7103-4 License rights [Non-commercial items] provides the standard license rights that a licensor grants to the Government are (1) unlimited rights, (2) Government purpose rights, or (3) limited rights. Those rights are defined in the clause at 252.227-7013, Rights in Technical Data—Noncommercial Items.

Technical information developed exclusively with Government funds may be used by the Government without restriction including going to another contractor to produce the item in question.

A second technical data rights scenario occurs when items/technical data is acquired using mixed funding – the Government gets Government purpose rights which allow the Government to go with another vendor provided a non disclosure agreement is signed with that other vendor and any tech data/drawings produced under that other contract are marked in accordance with the DFARS 252.227.7013 clause.

If the technical data was developed exclusively at private expense, the Government has limited rights. That means the rights to use, modify, and disclose the data within the Government. But it generally may not, without permission, release the data outside of the Government. DFARS 252.227-7013.

Contractors in the Government Workplace – OMB Circular A-76 Public – Private Competitions, Inherently Governmental Work (not permitted to be performed by a contractor) and Federal Trade Secret Act (FTSA) Impacts on Use of Contractors:

In other areas, problems frequently arise when Federal activities hire support contractors to assist them with executing their mission. These contracts frequently come into at least potential conflict with rules governing permissible use of contractors, such as rules against use of contractors for inherently governmental functions (See OMB Circular A-76) and rules against personal services (see above). One of the most serious problems can occur when a contractor is put into a position where they can see private party trade secrets, proprietary information or other contractor's proprietary information. The Federal Trade Secret Act (18 USC 1905) imposes criminal, civil and administrative sanctions on Federal employees who with knowledge allow proprietary, confidential or trade secret information to be used for an unauthorized purpose, including permitting other Federal contractors to view the proprietary information in question.

Given the overwhelming reliance on support contractors, it is now necessary to address this question of authorized use under the Federal Trade Secret Act. A simple solution is to include in the CLIN structure a statement, such as for example, "the Government may provide proprietary information received under this contract to support contractors provided no organizational conflict of interest occurs under FAR Subpart 9.5, the support contractor is not directly competing on the acquisition in question which originated the proprietary information in question and a non-disclosure agreement with each contractor recipient is accomplished requiring the contractor ensure such proprietary information is not disclosed outside of the Government activity handling the proprietary information." In this way, the contract that is the entry point for such proprietary information being handled by US Government support contractors includes an explicit authorization which avoids violation of the Federal Trade Secret Act provisions relating to authorized versus unauthorized use.

The DFARS includes a non-disclosure agreement at DFARS 227.7103-7, para c, which can be used in this case.

Markings:

Markings are critically important technical/proprietary data to manage in a Government contract. See:
 DFARS 252.227-7025 (Limitations on the Use or Disclosure of Government-Furnished Information Marked with Restrictive Legends),
 FAR 27.404(h) – Unauthorized marking of data – discusses the marking provisions of FAR clause 52.227-14
 DFARS 252.227-7017, Identification and Assertion of Use, Release or Disclosure Restrictions (Great clause to include for marking requirements, along with 52.227-14 clause)
 Markings also covered in DFARS clause 252.227-7013, Rights in Technical Data – Noncommercial Items, para (f)
 FAR 27.404(i) Omitted or incorrect notices – states that data delivered under a contract with FAR clause 52.227-14 without restricted markings/legends will be presumed to have been delivered with unlimited rights and the government assumes no liability for disclosure of such data.
Contracts which include technical data should include a markings section to ensure a contractor properly marks proprietary information and the Government protects it accordingly.

Patent rights are determined and dealt with separately from technical data and data rights. By default the Government owns ("receives title to") any invention first created, prototyped, or put into practice in the performance of a Government contract. (The patent law term is "reduced to practice".) Thus if an inventor designed something, convinced the Government to buy it, then created it for the first time in the performance of the contract, the Government takes title of it. The patent rights clause can specify that the contractor gets title or a license to the invention if the contractor follows some procedures within a specified time span and commercializes the invention or at least provides a commercialization plan.

Brand names 
FAR 11.104, Use of Brand Name or Equal Purchase Descriptions discusses acceptable uses of brand names in solicitations and how to do this. FAR 11.105 Items Peculiar to One Manufacturer states "agency requirements shall not be written so as to require a particular brand name or product or a feature of a product, peculiar to one manufacturer, thereby precluding consideration of a product manufactured by another company, unless:
 (a) the particular name brand, product or feature is essential to the Government's requirements and market research indicates other companies similar products, or products lacking the particular feature, do not meet, or cannot be modified to meet, the agency's needs.
 (b) the authority to contract without providing for full and open competition is supported by the required justification and approvals (See 6.302-1); and
 (c) the basis for not providing maximum practical competition is documented in the file when acquisition is awarded using simplified acquisition procedures."

Clauses for government contracts 
 Government contracts have mandatory clauses that must be included in a contract document. The FAR and DFARS have prescribing sections in them and the FAR has a table which can be used to determine required, as applicable or optional clauses by subject matter
 FAR 52.301 clause matrix – right clauses for the category, e.g., supplies, services, construction or commercial items and Options? IDIQ? Contract TYPE (see FAR Part 16) (i.e., fixed price (FP), FP with economic price adjustment, cost-reimbursement, incentive, time and materials, IDIQ, letter contracts, agreements under FAR Subpart 16.7, etc.). Note in FAR 52.301 that a clause must be in both the contract and the solicitation but provisions are only in solicitations.
Contracting activities are at unequal stages of transitioning to automated contract generation tools which have a menu driven system which generates the contract with appropriate clauses. However, frequently contracting officers do not have sufficient knowledge that some optional or required clause is applicable in a particular case – especially for intellectual property or other specialized acquisitions. With the transition to the automated systems, many contracting officers do not possess the knowledge to prepare a manual contract without the automated tool. Also, the automated systems frequently do not allow inclusion of various non standard work statement, instructions or clauses due to limitations on input options.

Criticisms 
Some have suggested that the complexity of complying with the FAR discourages competition, especially by small companies, and that there are "so many laws that we need to implement that our contracting officers in the trenches can’t even follow them all because they actually start to conflict with each other". While competing for and performing contracts under the FAR can be challenging for small businesses, the document itself is a generally well-organized single volume. The FAR and many other regulations were notable excluded from the Plain Writing Act of 2010.

See also: Government Accountability Office, Managing the Supplier Base in the 21st Century.

See also 
 Government procurement in the United States
Federal Procurement Data System
Sustainable procurement
 Title 48 of the Code of Federal Regulations

References

External links 
 Acquisition.gov - Federal Acquisition Regulations
 Defense FAR Supplement
 NASA FAR Supplement
 FARSite
 eCFR

Code of Federal Regulations
Government procurement in the United States
Accessible Procurement